Home Castle was launched in Aberdeen in 1811. From 1813 on she was a whaler in the British northern whale fishery (Greenland and Davis Strait). She was lost in 1829 while whaling in Davis Strait.

Career
Home Castle first appeared in the Register of Shipping (RS) and in Lloyd's Register in 1813.

Home Castle then made 16 annual voyages to the Northern Whale Fishery, being lost on her last. The data below came primarily from Coltish:

On her way to Davis Strait in early 1816 Home Castle became leaky and had to put into Burnt Islands, Newfoundland and Labrador to effect repairs.

Fate
Home Castle was wrecked on the coast of the Davis Strait, either while crossing or after having crossed Melville Bay. Lady Jane rescued two of her crew and took them into Newcastle.

Citations and references
Citations

References
 

1811 ships
Ships built in Aberdeen
Age of Sail merchant ships of England
Whaling ships
Maritime incidents in 1829